Battle of Stoczek was the first significant engagement of the November Uprising in Poland. It took place on 14 February 1831 near the town of Stoczek Łukowski, near the Brest–Warsaw road. Polish troops drove off two regiments of Russian mounted jaegers, inflicting heavy casualties on them in the process.

Background
The Russian Army commanded by Field Marshal Hans Karl von Diebitsch entered Poland on 4 February and started an advance towards Warsaw. 2nd Mounted-Jaeger Division—2 brigades of 2 regiments, each consisting of 3 troops of 2 squadrons—under baron Teodor Geismar, who assumed command just 9 days earlier, entered Poland on 13 February and was marching to the Brest road with some 20 10-pounder guns of field artillery attached. The main forces of Field Marshal Dybich were marching towards Warsaw from the direction of Lublin.
 
General Józef Dwernicki, commander of the Polish forces in the area, organised a Polish Division. He managed to gather 14 cavalry squadrons, 3 infantry battalions and 6 3-pounder guns—approximately 4,700 men at arms altogether, including 2,200 cavalrymen—and on 10 February he crossed the Vistula River.

At noon of February the 14th Geismar received some information regarding presence of Polish troops under Dwernicki near the town of Stoczek. In his usual style he decided to launch an immediate attack on them. Leaving as support troops his 2nd Brigade—Arzamas and Tiraspol Mounted-Jaeger Regiments—with some 10 guns, he took his 1st Brigade into battle, sending Pereyaslavl Mounted-Jaeger Regiment with 4 guns under supreme command of the 1st Brigade's CO major-general Pashkov by one road to approach Stoczek from north-east, while himself—with the Mounted-Jaeger Regiment of the Duke of Wirtemberg and 6 more guns—took the eastern root to the town. On the march his troops were separated by the huge forest and were marching by very narrow forest roads.

Dwernicki, a seasoned commander, although set his forces already to prepare for the night, kept a strong watch and was informed by fellow Poles of Geismar's approach well in advance. Now understanding clearly the Russians' plan, Dwernicki took his troops out to the field north of Stoczek, put his guns in to line from east to west, his infantry in two big squares on the flanks, one leaning on the thick forest to the west of his position, and his cavalry—to the south and north of his line, thus enabling them to fight the enemy whatever direction they approach from. There he stood, waiting.

"Battle"
In the early twilight the first column to reach the field was Pereyaslavl Regiment from north-east, Pashkov put his guns in line under Polish artillery shelling and dismounted the 1st Troop to protect them from Polish cavalry, then he ordered the 2nd Troop to engage the northern detachment of Polish cavalry. Then the
2nd Troop started on Poles, who, in turn, started on them, and then... without a clash 2nd Troop just turned their backs on Poles and went into forest. The 3rd Troop, still mounted, followed. Narrow road was of little to no help at this point. The 1st Troop and the artillery men, who barely shot their guns, were left to withstand the fierce attack of Polish Uhlans.

This was the only battle which really occurred that night.

While Polish Uhlans were busy finishing the Russian gunners and dismounted jaegers to the north and north-east of Polish position, Geismar himself arrived to his launch position, put his guns to the north of his troops and—unaware of the fate of Pashkov's troops—prepared to send the 3rd Troop of his Regiment into the battle from the south-east. But there was Polish cavalry again—in close formation and ready for fight. And the history repeated itself—the 3rd Troop just started on the Poles but turned back on them without any clash and rode away to safety by the very same road on which they had just arrived.

Geismar, deeply shocked by their behaviour, took personal command of the 2nd Troop asking them to join him in the charge, but the 2nd Troop just followed the 3rd. The 1st Troop followed them without hesitation, leaving baron Geismar and some of their officers at the field and been pursued by Polish Uhlans, who visibly enjoyed such a pleasant war.

Aftermath

Poles

In a quarter of an hour, with 46 killed and 59 wounded—mostly by several shells which Pashkov's artillery men managed to fire—Polish forces achieved the great result of scaring out the two Russian regular cavalry regiments with some 280 killed, 230 taken prisoner and 8 cannon lost. Two of the cannons the Russians were lucky enough to bring to safety due to them not being ready at the time of the Polish attack, still being attached to the horse harness's. Geismar and Pashkov themselves survived rather by chance.

The battle of Stoczek was the first Polish victory in the war and had a tremendous effect on Polish morale. In Warsaw they have had great celebrations with huge fireworks for the entire week. Poles especially enjoyed the fact that Dwernicki won over baron Geismar, whose fame as the greatest Russian vanguard commander was fresh from the Russo-Turkish War (1828–29).

Russians

Geismar himself officially wrote to Diebitsch that "soldiers were just struck with sudden panic-attack", but in his private letter to his friend Colonel Anrep, who was about to take charge of the Pereyaslvl Mounted-Jaeger Regiment after above-described battle, he expressed great concern regarding the general moral and military capability of the Regiment, bitterly complaining that in all his years of service with Russians, he was always a great admirer of virtues of Russian Soldier—until that very day. He always described this attack as one of his greatest mistakes—though not on the battlefield but, rather, in his own estimation of the moral attitude of his troops. They report him saying constantly on the matter: "If I would only have been aware of the moral state of my men at the time I launched the operation—surely, I wouldn't dare to attack Dwernicki's troops at all, not to discuss 'in such a position."

In 1833 Nicolas I of Russia disbanded Mounted-Jaegers as the type of cavalry. People were sent to the other cavalry regiments in accordance with matches of hue of their horses.

Literature
 Memoire of General Baron Theodore Geismar and comments on them. Vladimir Geismar. Russkaya Starina (Old Times in Russia) - 1881, book 5; 1882, book 1 (in Russian Old Spelling).

References

Conflicts in 1831
Battles of the November Uprising
1831 in Poland
February 1831 events